Nenilinium is a genus of Asian dwarf spiders that was first described by K. Y. Eskov in 1988.

Species
 it contains two species:
Nenilinium asiaticum Eskov, 1988 (type) – Russia
Nenilinium luteolum (Loksa, 1965) – Russia, Mongolia

See also
 List of Linyphiidae species (I–P)

References

Araneomorphae genera
Linyphiidae
Spiders of Asia
Spiders of Russia